Kartik Chandran is an American environmental engineer at Columbia University, where he is a Professor in the Department of Earth and Environmental Engineering.  He primarily works on the interface between environmental molecular and microbiology, environmental biotechnology and environmental engineering.  The focus of his research is on elucidating the molecular microbial ecology and metabolic pathways of the microbial nitrogen cycle.  Applications of his work have ranged from energy and resource efficient treatment of nitrogen containing wastewater streams, development and implementation of sustainable approaches to sanitation to novel models for resource recovery. Under his stewardship, the directions of biological wastewater treatment and biological nutrient removal were established for the first ever time in the history of Columbia University.

In 2015, he received the MacArthur Fellowship for his innovative work on "integrating microbial ecology, molecular biology, and engineering to transform wastewater from a troublesome pollutant to a valuable resource".

Education and career
Chandran graduated with a B.S.(Honors) in Chemical Engineering from the University of Roorkee, now the Indian Institute of Technology, Roorkee. He obtained a Ph.D. in Environmental Engineering at the University of Connecticut in 1999 and worked there as a post-doctoral fellow until 2001. From 2001-2004, he worked as a senior technical specialist with the engineering firm, Metcalf and Eddy (now part of AECOM).  From 2004-2005, he was a research associate at Virginia Polytechnic Institute and State University. Chandran joined Columbia University in 2005 as Assistant Professor of Environmental Engineering.

Select Awards and Honors
Harry Kinsel Award for Best Scientific Publication, Metcalf and Eddy (2003)
National Research Council Summer Faculty Fellow (2007)
National Science Foundation Early CAREER Development Award (2009)
Water Environment Research Foundation Paul Busch Award (2010)
Member Board of Trustees, Water Environment Federation (2010-2013)
Fellow, Water Environment Federation (2013)
Guest Professor, Royal Dutch Academy of Arts and Sciences (2014)
Invited Participant, National Academy of Engineering, China America Frontiers of Engineering (2015)
MacArthur Fellows Program (2015)

Selected works
 S Vajpeyi, K Chandran*, 2015, "Microbial conversion of synthetic and food waste-derived volatile fatty acids to lipids", Bioresource Technology 188, 49-55
 Khunjar, W.*, D. Jiang, B. Wett, S. Murthy and K. Chandran*, 2015 "Characterizing the metabolic tradeoff in Nitrosomonas europaea in response to changes in inorganic carbon supply", Environmental Science and Technology, 2015, 49 (4), pp 2523–2531
 Ma, Y., S. Sundar, H. Park, and K. Chandran*, 2015, "The effect of inorganic carbon on microbial interactions in a biofilm nitritation-anammox process", Water Research, 70, 246-254
 Lu, H., K. Chandran*, H. D. Stensel, 2014 "Microbial ecology of denitrification in biological wastewater treatment", Water Research, 64, 237-254
 Lu, H. M. Kalyuzhnaya and K. Chandran*, 2012 "Comparative proteomic and transcriptional analysis reveal insights into facultative methylotrophy of Methyloversatilis universalis FAM5*", Environmental Microbiology, 14(11), 2935-2945.
 Wang, J. S.*, S. P. Hamburg, D. E. Pryor, K. Chandran, G. T. Daigger, 2011 "Emissions credits:  Opportunity to promote integrated nitrogen management in the wastewater sector", Environmental Science and Technology, 45(15), 6239–6246
 Ahn, J.-H., S. Kim, H. Park, K. Pagilla and K. Chandran*, 2010 "N2O emissions from activated sludge 2008-2009: Results of a nationwide monitoring survey in the United States" Environmental Science and Technology, 44(12), 4505-4511.
 Park, H., A. Rosenthal, K. Ramalingam, J. Fillos and K. Chandran*, 2010 "Linking community profiles, gene expression and N-removal in anammox bioreactors treating municipal anaerobic digestion reject water" Environmental Science and Technology, 44(16), 6110-6116.
 Yu, R., M. Kampschreur, M. C. M. van Loosdrecht and K. Chandran*, 2010 "Mechanisms and specific directionality in autotrophic nitrous oxide and nitric oxide generation during transient anoxia" Environmental Science and Technology, 44(4), 1313-1319.

References

External links
http://www.columbia.edu/~kc2288/

Living people
MacArthur Fellows
Columbia University faculty
Date of birth missing (living people)
21st-century American engineers
University of Connecticut alumni
Year of birth missing (living people)
Columbia School of Engineering and Applied Science faculty